Stathmonotus hemphillii, the blackbelly blenny, is a species of chaenopsid blenny found in coral reefs in the western central Atlantic ocean. It can reach a maximum length of  TL. This species can also be found in the aquarium trade. The specific name honours the malacologist Henry Hemphill (1830-1914) who collected the type.

References
 Bean, T.H., 1885 (29 June) On Stathmonotus, a new genus of fishes related to Muraenoides, from Florida. Proceedings of the United States National Museum v. 8 (no. 508): 191–192, Pl. 13.

hemphillii
Fish described in 1885